Karianne Oldernes Tung (born 21 January 1984) is a Norwegian politician for the Labour Party. She was elected to the Norwegian parliament in 2013 for Sør-Trøndelag.

She is a member of Rissa municipal council and of Sør-Trøndalag county council. She has worked particularly with educational issues, but split her time in Parliament between the Standing Committee on Health and Care Services (2013–2015) and the Standing Committee on Transport and Communications (2015–2017).

References 

1984 births
Living people
People from Rissa, Norway
Labour Party (Norway) politicians
Members of the Storting
Sør-Trøndelag politicians
21st-century Norwegian politicians